Seder (plural:  sedarim) is a Hebrew word meaning "order" or "sequence" may also refer to:

Jewish holidays
Passover Seder, a ritualized dinner observed during Passover
Tu BiShvat, a seder for this minor Jewish holiday modeled on the Passover Seder

Hebrew Bible
A portion of a biblical book in the Masoretic Text of the Tanakh; this quantitative division is related to the triennial cycle for reading the Torah
A colloquial term for the weekly Torah portion in the annual cycle of reading the Torah (in this context often pronounced sidra)

Talmudic texts
One of the six orders (major sections) of the Mishnah
A study session in a Yeshiva's daily schedule; see Yeshiva #Structure and features.

Jewish liturgy
An order of prayers that constitutes a liturgy

Jewish mysticism
Seder hishtalshelus, a concept in kabbalah about the nature of God

People with the surname
Đuro Seder (born 1927), Croatian painter
Sam Seder (born 1966), American actor
Tim Seder (born 1974), American football player